Sarugani  is a river flowing in the Sivagangai district of the Indian state of Tamil Nadu.

References

See also 
 List of rivers of Tamil Nadu

Rivers of Tamil Nadu
Sivaganga district
Rivers of India